Gō, Go, Gou or Goh (written: ,  or ) is a masculine Japanese given name. Notable people with the name include:

, Japanese curler
, Japanese bondage artist
, Japanese rugby union player
, Japanese actor
, Japanese footballer
, Japanese footballer
, Japanese golfer
, Japanese female manga artist
, Japanese footballer
, Japanese footballer
, Japanese actor
, Japanese footballer
, Japanese baseball player
, Japanese baseball player
, Japanese volleyball player
, Japanese manga artist and writer
, Japanese footballer
, Japanese footballer
Goh Nakamura, American musician, film score composer and actor
, Japanese footballer
, Japanese footballer and manager
, Japanese writer
, Japanese film director and actor
, Japanese film director
, Japanese anime and video game composer
, Japanese professional wrestler
, Japanese tennis player
, Japanese film director
, Japanese footballer
, Japanese actor
, Japanese Nordic combined skier
, Japanese kickboxer
, Japanese writer and anime screenwriter

Japanese masculine given names